See How They Run is an English comedy in three acts by Philip King. Its title is a line from the nursery rhyme "Three Blind Mice". It is considered a farce for its tense comic situations and headlong humour, heavily playing on mistaken identity, doors, and vicars. In 1955 it was adapted as a film starring Roland Culver.

Early production history
King wrote the first act in 1942 under the title Moon Madness, with the final act completed in 1943. His play was first staged by Henry Kendall at the Peterborough Rep in 1944 prior to a British tour as an entertainment for the troops, under the auspices of ENSA.

Henry Kendall's production, re-cast and restaged, was then presented by producer Jack de Leon at his Q Theatre, close to Kew Bridge, as Christmas entertainment opening on 21 December 1944. It then transferred – with one change of cast – to the Comedy Theatre, opening to rave reviews on 4 January 1945.

The cast included Joan Hickson as the maid Ida (an actress new to comedy who had been acting at the Q Theatre since 1942) and starred Beryl Mason and George Gee as Penelope and Clive. It ran for 18 months at the Comedy, notching up 589 performances.

The West End opening night was not without its perils. Three 'doodle-bugs' (V-1 flying bombs) exploded nearby. No-one budged until after the play was over, but Gee complained at the cast party that all three went off just as he was speaking his funniest lines.

Plot

The play is set in 1943 for the original (or shortly after the end of World War II in the rewrite) in the living room of the vicarage at the fictitious village of Merton-cum-Middlewick (merging various actual village names, such as Merton and Middlewick, both in Oxfordshire.

The lead character is Penelope Toop, former actress and now wife of the local vicar, the Rev. Lionel Toop. The Toops employ Ida, a Cockney maid. Miss Skillon, a churchgoer of the parish and a scold, arrives on bicycle to gossip with the vicar and to complain about the latest 'outrages' that Penelope has caused. The vicar then leaves for the night, and an old friend of Penelope's, Lance-Corporal Clive Winton, stops by on a quick visit. To dodge army regulations, he changes from his uniform into Lionel's second-best suit, complete with a clerical 'dog-collar' to see a production of "Private Lives" (a Noël Coward play in which they had appeared together in their acting days), while pretending to be the visiting vicar Arthur Humphrey who is due to preach the Sunday sermon the next day.

Just before they set out, Penelope and Clive re-enact a fight scene from "Private Lives" and accidentally knock Miss Skillon (who has come back unannounced) unconscious. Miss Skillon, wrongly thinking she has seen Lionel fighting with Penelope, gets drunk on a bottle of cooking sherry and Ida hides her in the broom cupboard. Then Lionel, arriving back, is knocked silly by a German spy on the run, who takes the vicar's clothes as a disguise. To add to the confusion, both Penelope's uncle, the Bishop of Lax, and the real Humphrey unexpectedly show up early. Chaos quickly ensues, culminating in a cycle of running figures and mistaken identities. In the end, a police sergeant arrives in search of the spy to find four suspects, Lionel, Clive, Humphrey and the German, all dressed as clergy. No one can determine the identity of the spy (or anyone else for that matter) and the German is almost free when he is revealed and foiled by the quick work of Clive and Ida. The scene calms down as the sergeant leads the spy away and Humphrey leaves. Miss Skillon emerges from the closet, and she, the Bishop and Lionel demand an explanation. Penelope and Clive begin to explain in two-part harmony, getting up to the scene from "Private Lives," when Miss Skillon again manages to catch a blow in the face. She falls back into Ida's arms as the curtain falls.

Changes
In the original, Clive is an English actor and former co-star of Penelope's, now conscripted into the British army – in the rewrite he is in the US Army.
In the original, the prisoner is a German escapee from the local POW camp – in the rewrite, he is a captured Russian spy escaping from the nearby American base.
In the original, Penelope speaks in RP British English – in the rewrite, she becomes an American.

Quotes
"The only other bishop's niece I know is in the chorus at The Windmill"
"Darling, a woman with a bottom like that could say anything"
"Sergeant, arrest most of these vicars"
"You can't shoot me! I have diabetes!" (film version)
"How about The Wreck of the Hesperus?" "She's gone back to the cupboard"

Film

The play was made into a film in 1955. Directed by Leslie Arliss and starred Ronald Shiner as Clive (renamed Wally), Greta Gynt as Penelope and Dora Bryan as Ida. Arliss and Philip King collaborated on the screenplay.

Revivals
The first London revival was staged by Alexander Doré at the Vaudeville Theatre in July 1964, with a strong cast including the author Philip King in the role of The Bishop of Lax, but it ran for less than a month. More successfully, the play was revived by John David at the Greenwich Theatre on 30 November 1978, winning especially good reviews for Andrew Robertson portraying The Reverend Arthur Humphrey as a Robertson Hare lookalike, and played a busy Christmas and New Year season, closing in mid-January 1979.

In 1984, Ray Cooney directed a revival of Philip King's farce "See How They Run,''  which opened at London's Shaftesbury Theatre on February 8, presented by the Theatre of Comedy. It had Maureen Lipman (Miss Skillion), Royce Mills (Rev. Lionel Toop), Liza Goddard (Penelope Toop), Carol Hawkins (Ida), Christopher Timothy (Corporal Clive Winton), Peter Blake (The Intruder), Derek Nimmo (Rev. Arthur Humphrey), Michael Denison (Bishop of Lax) and Bill Pertwee (Sgt. Towers) in leading roles. 

A Channel 4 90-minute adaptation broadcast at Christmas 1984, directed by Ray Cooney and Les Chatfield, starred Cooney's 1984 West End cast, including Ray Cooney as Police Sergeant.

The play was also revived on stage at the Richmond Theatre, Surrey (28 February – 4 March 2006), and at the Duchess Theatre, London (26 June – 28 October 2006) following a short national tour. The production was directed by Douglas Hodge.

Hattie Morahan starred as Penelope Toop in the touring production, the part later being taken by Nancy Carroll for the West End, who played alongside her real-life husband Jo Stone-Fewings as Clive. The cast also included Nicholas Rowe as the Reverend Toop, Julie Legrand as Miss Skillon, Nicholas Blane as Humphrey, Natalie Grady as Ida, Adrian Fear as the PoW, and Chris MacDonnell as the Policeman.

For the Duchess Theatre run, the cast included Tim Pigott-Smith as The Bishop of Lax. The production received excellent notices.

2008 saw a revival at the Royal Exchange Theatre, Manchester (15 December 2008 – 24 January 2009) starring Laura Rogers as Penelope Toop and Nick Caldecott as Reverend Toop.

In 2014 the play was revived in a UK touring production featuring short actors by Warwick Davis's Reduced Height Theatre Company.

References

External links

London 2006 production
Review of reviews 

1945 plays
English plays
Plays about World War II
Fiction set in 1943